Dream of You is the second single from the 2001 Schiller gold album Weltreise with vocals by Peter Heppner and backing vocals by Isgaard. The song was officially released on 11 June 2001 and peaked at number 13 on the German singles charts in 2001.

Dream of You won the German music award Echo in the category "Dance Single des Jahres national" (National dance single of the year) in 2002.

Track listing

Version 1 
Single with blue cover.

Version 2 
Single with white cover.

Music video

The music video for "Dream of You" was produced by Blau Medien GmbH and was shot in 2001 in Barcelona by German director Marcus Sternberg. The cinematographer of the video shot was Felix Storp. The video features Peter Heppner and others and shows mostly scenes from a beach.

Charts

References

External links
 
 The music video of Dream of You

2008 singles
Schiller (band) songs
2001 songs
Songs written by Christopher von Deylen
Songs written by Peter Heppner